Frederick Ferdinand Schafer (August 16, 1839 - July 18, 1927) was a German-born American painter. He was born in Braunschweig, Germany and he emigrated to the United States in 1876, at age 37. He opened a studio on Montgomery Street in San Francisco, and he lived in Oakland, Over the course of his career, he did over 500 paintings. He died in Oakland at age 87. His work is in the permanent collections of the Birmingham Museum of Art, the Fairfield University Art Museum, and the Northwest Museum of Arts and Culture.

Citations

General references

1839 births
1927 deaths
Artists from Oakland, California
Artists from San Francisco
German emigrants to the United States
Painters from California
Artists from Braunschweig
20th-century American painters
19th-century German painters
19th-century German male artists
20th-century American male artists